Eastern Switzerland is the common name of the region situated to the east of Glarus Alps, with the cantons of Schaffhausen, Thurgau, St. Gallen, Appenzell Ausserrhoden, Appenzell Innerrhoden, and Glarus. The north of canton of Graubünden (with the city of Chur) is usually considered to be part of Eastern Switzerland as well.

Eastern Switzerland is also defined as one of the NUTS-2 regions of Switzerland. In this case, it includes the cantons of Appenzell Ausserrhoden, Appenzell Innerrhoden, Glarus, Graubünden, Schaffhausen, St. Gallen, and Thurgau.

Notes and references 

Regions of Switzerland